The 1926 Northwestern Wildcats team represented Northwestern University during the 1926 Big Ten Conference football season. The Wildcats compiled a 7–1 record and outscored their opponents by a combined total of 179 to 22.

Schedule

References

Northwestern
Northwestern Wildcats football seasons
Big Ten Conference football champion seasons
Northwestern Wildcats football